Ellsworth Bishop Foote (January 12, 1898 – January 18, 1977) was a U.S. Representative from Connecticut.

Born in North Branford, Connecticut, Foote attended the public schools.
He was graduated from Yale Business College in 1916 and from Georgetown University Law School, Washington, D.C., in 1923.
He was admitted to the bar in 1924 and commenced practice in New Haven, Connecticut.
Corporation counsel of North Branford 1924-1946.
He served as special assistant to the Attorney General, at the United States Department of Justice, Washington, D.C., February 1925 to July 1926.
He served as chairman of the board of finance of North Branford 1934-1946.
He served as judge of probate, North Branford District from 1938 to 1946.
Acting judge of probate, New Haven Probate Court, November 1944 to July 1945.
Attorney for the county of New Haven 1942-1946.
Again from 1949 to 1960.

Foote was elected as a Republican to the Eightieth Congress (January 3, 1947 – January 3, 1949).
He was an unsuccessful candidate for reelection in 1948 to the Eighty-first Congress.
Corporation counsel for town of North Branford.
He resumed the practice of law.
He died in Guilford, Connecticut, January 18, 1977.
He was interred in Bare Plain Cemetery, North Branford, Connecticut.

His daughter, Roberta (Foote) Koontz, ran unsuccessfully for congress in 1984.

References

External links

 

1898 births
1977 deaths
Yale University alumni
Georgetown University Law Center alumni
Republican Party members of the United States House of Representatives from Connecticut
Connecticut state court judges
20th-century American judges
20th-century American politicians